New Orleans Jazz National Historical Park is a U.S. National Historical Park in the Tremé neighborhood of New Orleans, near the French Quarter.  It was created in 1994 to celebrate the origins and evolution of jazz.

Most of the historical park property consists of  within Louis Armstrong Park leased by the National Park Service.  There is a visitor center at 916 North Peters Street and a concert venue, several blocks away in the French Quarter.  The Park provides a setting for sharing the cultural history of the people and places which helped to shape the development and progression of jazz in New Orleans. National Park Service staff present information and resources associated with the origins and early development of jazz, through interpretive techniques designed to educate and entertain.

Perseverance Hall No. 4

The centerpiece of the site is Perseverance Hall No. 4.  Originally a Masonic Lodge, it was built between 1819 and 1820, making it the oldest Masonic temple in Louisiana.

Perseverance Hall was listed on the National Register of Historic Places on October 2, 1973. The entire National Historical Park was administratively listed on the Register on the date of its authorization, October 31, 1994.

See also
Jean Lafitte National Historical Park and Preserve, with some of its constituent properties located in or near New Orleans
New Orleans Jazz Museum

References
General references:

 The National Parks: Index 2001–2003. Washington: U.S. Department of the Interior

Specific references:

External links

Official NPS website
 Archived NPS website, with more information about the structures and history of the park

  New Orleans Jazz NHP - Evolution of the Jazz Complex, a 2001 article from Vol. 24, No. 2 of the NPS Cultural Resource Management magazine
Official National Parks Foundation website

National Historical Parks of the United States
Parks on the National Register of Historic Places in Louisiana
Parks in New Orleans
Jazz organizations
Music of New Orleans
History of New Orleans
Protected areas established in 1994
National Park Service areas in Louisiana
1994 establishments in Louisiana
National Register of Historic Places in New Orleans